Smokehouse Pictures is an American film and television production company. The company was founded in 2006 by George Clooney and Grant Heslov after the shutdown of Section Eight Productions. Its name is taken from the Smoke House restaurant, located across the street from Warner Bros. Studios in Burbank, California.

The company signed a long-term production and development agreement with Warner Bros. Pictures and Warner Bros. Television in July 2006.
In June 2009, the company signed an exclusive two-year theatrical development and production deal with Sony Pictures Entertainment.

Filmography

Films

Television

References

Film production companies of the United States